The Altiplano (Spanish for "high plain"), Collao (Quechua and Aymara: Qullaw, meaning "place of the Qulla") or Andean Plateau, in west-central South America, is the most extensive high plateau on Earth outside Tibet. The plateau is located at the latitude of the widest part of the north-south-trending Andes. The bulk of the Altiplano lies in Bolivia, but its northern parts lie in Peru, and its southwestern fringes lie in Chile.

There are on the plateau several cities in each of these three nations, including El Alto, La Paz, Oruro, and Puno. The northeastern part of the Altiplano is more humid than the southwestern part, which has several salares (salt flats), due to its aridity. At the Bolivia–Peru border lies Lake Titicaca, the largest lake in South America. Farther south, in Bolivia, there was until recently a lake, Lake Poopó, but by December 2015 it had completely dried up, and was declared defunct. It is unclear whether that lake, which had been the second-largest in Bolivia, can be restored.

The Altiplano was the site of several pre-Columbian cultures, including the Chiripa, Tiawanaku and the Inca Empire. Spain conquered the region in the 16th century.

Today, major economic activities in the Altiplano include mining, llama and vicuña herding, and services (in its cities). The area also attracts some international tourism.

Geography 

The Altiplano is an area of inland drainage (endorheism) lying in the central Andes, occupying parts of northern Chile, western Bolivia, southern Peru and northwest Argentina. Its height averages about 3,750 meters (12,300 feet), slightly less than that of the Tibetan Plateau. Unlike conditions in Tibet, the Altiplano is dominated by massive active volcanoes of the Central Volcanic Zone to the west, such as Ampato (6288 m), Tutupaca (5,816 m), Parinacota (6348 m), Guallatiri (6071 m), Paruma (5,728 m), Uturunku (6,008 m) and Licancabur (5,916 m), and the Cordillera Real in the north east with Illampu (6,368 m), Huayna Potosí (6,088 m), Janq'u Uma (6,427 m) and Illimani (6,438 m). The Atacama Desert, one of the driest areas on the planet, lies to the southwest of the Altiplano; to the east lies the humid Amazon rainforest.

The Altiplano is noted for hypoxic air caused by very high elevation. The communities that inhabit the Altiplano include Qulla, Uros, Quechua and Aymara.

Geology 

Several mechanisms have been put forth for the formation of the Altiplano plateau; hypotheses try to explain why the topography in the Andes incorporates this large area of low relief at high altitude (high plateau) within the orogen: 
 Existence of weaknesses in the Earth's crust prior to tectonic shortening. Such weaknesses would cause the partition of tectonic deformation and uplift into the eastern and western cordillera, leaving the necessary space for the formation of the altiplano basin.
 Magmatic processes rooted in the asthenosphere might have contributed to uplift of the plateau.
 Climate has controlled the spatial distribution of erosion and sediment deposition, controlling the lubrication along the subducting Nazca Plate and hence influencing the transmission of tectonic forces into South America.
 Climate also determined the formation of internal drainage (endorheism) and sediment trapping within the Andes, potentially blocking tectonic deformation in the central area between the two cordilleras, and expelling deformation towards the flanks of the orogen
 Convective removal of the dense lower lithosphere beneath the Altiplano caused that region to isostatically 'float' higher

At various times during the Pleistocene epoch, both the southern and northern Altiplano were covered by vast pluvial lakes. Remnants are Lake Titicaca, straddling the Peru–Bolivia border, and Poopó, a salt lake that extends south of Oruro, Bolivia. Salar de Uyuni, locally known as Salar de Tunupa, and Salar de Coipasa are two large dry salt flats formed after the Altiplano paleolakes dried out.

Climate 

The term Altiplano is sometimes used to identify the altitude zone and the type of climate that prevails within it: it is colder than that of the tierra fría but not as cold as that of the tierra helada. Scientists classify the latter as commencing at an elevation of approximately 4,500 meters (or about 15,000 feet). Alternate names used in place of altiplano in this context include puna and páramos.

The coldest temperatures occur in the southwestern portion of the Altiplano during the winter months of June and July. The seasonal cycle of rainfall is marked, with the rainy season concentrated between December and March. The rest of the year tends to be very dry, cool, windy and sunny. Snowfall may happen between April and September, especially to the north, but it is not very common (between one and five times a year).

See also 
 Lake Tauca
 Gran Chaco
 Guatemalan Highlands
 Mexican Plateau
 Puna de Atacama
 Yungas

References

External links

Photo Gallery of Altiplano in Argentina, Bolivia and Chile
Photo Gallery: Argentinian Puna
Water resources of Chilean Altiplano
 

Plateaus of the Andes
Climatic and glaciological subregions of the Andes
Ecoregions of the Andes
Montane ecology
Landforms of Argentina
Plateaus of Bolivia
Plateaus of Chile
Plateaus of Peru
Endorheic basins of South America
Natural regions of South America
Physiographic sections
Regions of Argentina
Regions of Bolivia
Altiplano